was a Japanese golfer whose victory, with partner Koichi Ono, at the 1957 Canada Cup outside Tokyo helped to spur a boom in golf in Japan.

Nakamura, also known as "Pete", "Tora-san," and "the Putting God", was born in Yokohama, Kanagawa Prefecture and became a caddie at the age of 14.  He became a professional golfer at the age of 20.  He won the Japan Open in 1952, and won it twice more in his career, and was the first Japanese player to play in the Masters Tournament, in 1958.

In 1957, Nakamura and Ono teamed up to win the Canada Cup over a field which included Sam Snead and Gary Player. Nakamura also won the individual championship, at Kasumigaseki Country Club in Saitama Prefecture.

In 1974, Nakamura became President of the Japanese Ladies' Professional Golf Association. He was a mentor and teacher to Hisako Higuchi, the current JLPGA chairwoman and a member of the World Golf Hall of Fame.

Tournament wins

this list is probably incomplete
1950 Kanto Open
1951 Kanto Open
1952 Japan Open, Kanto Open
1953 Kanto Open
1956 Japan Open, Kanto Open
1957 Kanto Open, Japan PGA Championship, Canada Cup (team event with Koichi Ono and individual event)
1958 Japan Open, Kanto Open, Japan PGA Championship
1959 Japan PGA Championship
1960 Chunichi Crowns, Kanto Pro Championship
1961 Kanto Pro Championship, Camp Zama Pro-Am Tournament
1962 Japan PGA Championship, Camp Zama Pro-Am Tournament
1964 Camp Zama Pro-Am Tournament
1968 Kanto Pro Championship
1973 Japan PGA Senior Championship
1976 Japan PGA Senior Championship

Team appearances
Canada Cup (representing Japan): 1954, 1957 (winners, individual winner), 1958, 1959, 1961, 1962

References

External links

Images of Torakichi Nakamura
Japan PGA Hall of Fame 

Japanese male golfers
Japan Golf Tour golfers
Sportspeople from Yokohama
1915 births
2008 deaths